The 2008 World Judo Open Championships were held at Palais des sports Marcel-Cerdan in Levallois-Perret, France, 20 and 21 December 2008.

Medal overview

Men's events

Women's events

Medals table

Tournament results

Men's event

Final

Pool A and B

Pool C and D

Women's event

Pool A-D

External links
 

Wor
O
Judo
World